Poionos was an ancient Greek city located in the region of Epirus.

See also
List of cities in ancient Epirus

References

Sources

Cities in ancient Epirus
Former populated places in Greece
Populated places in ancient Epirus
Lost ancient cities and towns